Rostovskoye is a rural locality (a village) in Osinovskoye Rural Settlement of Vinogradovsky District, Arkhangelsk Oblast, Russia. The population was 56 as of 2010. There is 1 street.

Geography 
Rostovskoye is located on the Severnaya Dvina River, 26 km southeast of Bereznik (the district's administrative centre) by road. Rostovskoye is the nearest rural locality.

References 

Rural localities in Vinogradovsky District
Shenkursky Uyezd